The San Francisco/Northern California Emmy Award are an award bestowed by the San Francisco/Northern California Chapter of the National Academy of Television Arts and Sciences. The San Francisco, California-based chapter was founded in 1961. In addition to granting the San Francisco/Northern California Emmy Awards, this chapter awards scholarships, honors industry veterans at the Silver Circle Celebration, conducts National Student Television Awards of Excellence, has a free research and a nationwide job bank. The chapter also participates in judging Emmy entries at the regional and national levels.

Boundaries

This academy is one of the largest chapters whose area covers California, from Visalia to the Oregon border; Hawaii; and Reno, Nevada. Entrants within these borders submit television broadcast materials for awards considerations.

Board of governors

The Board of Governors is a working board, which works together collaboratively to ensure they are providing for the best interests of the membership

Emmy award winners

Emmy award winners are individuals who show excellence in the field of television. The Emmys are held to the same esteem as the Oscar Awards are to motion pictures or the Grammy Awards are to the music industry.

References

Regional Emmy Awards
Awards established in 1961
1961 establishments in California